Lužarji is a small village in the hills southwest of Velike Lašče in central Slovenia. The entire Municipality of Velike Lašče is part of the traditional region of Lower Carniola and is now included in the Central Slovenia Statistical Region.

Name
The name Lužarji is a collective toponym, referring to a settlement where several people with the surname Lužar lived.

Church

The local church, built outside the settlement to the north, is dedicated to Saint Oswald and belongs to the Parish of Velike Lašče. It is a medieval building that was thoroughly rebuilt in the mid-18th century. The church was burned during the Second World War, at Christmas 1942. After the war, there was political opposition in Yugoslavia to restoring the church. It was restored in the 1980s and was consecrated by Bishop Stanislav Lenič on August 1, 1982.

References

External links

Lužarji on Geopedia

Populated places in the Municipality of Velike Lašče